The Celestial's Shaw Brothers Film Library is the World's Largest Chinese Film Library consisting of over 760 feature films originally released over a forty-year time frame from the 1950s to the 1990s produced by Shaw Brothers Studio. The genres of the library range from Kung Fu, Action, Martial Arts, Erotica, Comedy, Horror, Situation Drama, Musical, Period Drama, Thriller, etc.

Celestial's Shaw Brothers Film Library is a wholly owned film library by Celestial Pictures.

Everlasting Masterpieces Digital-Remastered since 2002
Until Celestial Pictures restored the films from their original negatives and released them on DVD beginning in 2002, very few titles from the Shaw Brothers film archive had previously appeared in any electronic multimedia form since their original cinema release in 50s-90s.

State of the art digital technologies are employed to restore each and every frame - 150,000 on average - for every film. Film fans around the world are then made access to some of the best Chinese's films ever produced with all sound and picture quality even more stunning than the original cinematic prints.

Shaw Brothers Actors & Actresses
A-list lineup of film stars is one of the major attractions of the Celestial's Shaw Brothers Film Library. Many of whom still dominate the pan-Asian film industry, including Jet Li, Chow Yun-fat, Stephen Chow, Gordon Liu, Cheng Pei-pei, Maggie Cheung, and Andy Lau.

Shaw Brothers Directors & Crew
The Shaw Brothers Studio also nurtured the careers of many modern talented and high-profile filmmakers, including John Woo, Yuen Woo Ping and Tony Ching Siu-tung.

The studio's legendary martial-arts directors include but not limited to, Chang Cheh, King Hu, Liu Chia-liang and Chu Yuan. Its distinguished martial-arts styles continue to influence action films around the world.

Lists of genres in the library

 Kung Fu - Action 
Kung Fu - Martial Arts
Erotica
Comedy
Horror
Drama
Musical
Period Drama
Thriller

References
Corrected links as of 27 September 2010.

 Celestial Pictures (2009), About Shaw Brothers, retrieved on 27 September 2010, 
 Celestial Pictures (2009), Celestial Pictures - Download Catalogue, retrieved on 27 September 2010, 

 
Film organisations in Hong Kong